Stefan Pater (born 31 October 1960) is a retired German football forward.

References

External links
 

1960 births
Living people
German footballers
Bundesliga players
VfL Bochum players
Arminia Bielefeld players
Association football forwards